Pierre Alexandre is a writer, a journalist and a businessman. He has found and is the CEO of New York Financial Press, a media company based in Wall Street, inside the Stock Exchange.

Education
Born in 1964, Pierre Alexandre graduated from the Paris Institute of Political Studies (Institut d'Études Politiques de Paris) and from IPJ, a French journalist school.

Career

Alexandre has worked with France Info, Capital, L'Express and BFM. He was also editor in chief of Strategies.

In 2000, he becomes the correspondent in Wall Street for TF1, a French television station, and later for LCI. He works with France24, the worldwide news channel, and Europe 1, a national French radio station.

In 2005, Alexandre created New York Financial Press (NYFP). NYFP produces on line videos with a financial content available in eight languages: French, English, Spanish, Arabic, Portuguese, Russians, Chinese and Japanese. NYFP produces videos on business news  for an international audience, including live spots from Wall Street studios, analysis of the other markets and financial centers (Asia and Europe), as well as ad hoc reports on request for French and other European media outlets.

Bibliography
2004: John F. Kerry; l’homme qui veut arrêter Bush (Editions Anne Carrière)
2002: Dans les coulisses de Wall Street; de l’euphorie aux larmes (Editions Fayard)
2000: Le retour du plein-emploi - co-written with the economist Marc Touati (Editions Anne Carrière)
1997: Les patrons de presse; quinze ans d’histoires secrètes de la presse écrite en France (Editions Anne Carrière)

References

External links
Netvibes.com

American business and financial journalists
American male journalists
Living people
American chief executives
Year of birth missing (living people)